Don Pedro Dimas (born 1934) is a Mexican violinist, guitarist, composer, and preservationist of traditional music from the Purépecha, an indigenous culture in the Mexican state of Michoacán.

Life and career
Dimas was born in the village of Ichupio, Michoacán, near the city of Tzintzuntzan, to a musical family, and received only two years of formal education. While in his teens, Dimas learned to play the mandolin and violin, initially to provide music for folkdancing performances.

In 1952, Dimas began to play with a group from Santa Fe de la Laguna. The name reflects the indigenous utopian cooperative villages or "hospitales" created by Bishop Quiroga in the Michoacán area in the late 15th century. Later, he began playing with a mariachi in Tzintzuntzan, and learned many styles from them. When the group went to Mexico City, Dimas stayed behind to farm and fish.

As an adult, Dimas composed and choreographed the folk dance "Dance of the Tumbis", which represents the life of a fisherman on Lake Pátzcuaro.

Dimas currently performs with his band Mirando el Lago throughout Mexico and the United States.

Preservation of Purépecha culture

The Purépecha language was still spoken by somewhat fewer than 100,000 people at the end of the 20th century, mostly in small rural villages. But while the language thrived, the traditional music of the Purépecha was threatened by the popularity of other styles. Dimas sees his composition of new songs in the traditional genre "a form of rescue."

References
Stavely, Zaidee Playing Music to the Scent of Marigolds: The Day of the Dead in Michoacán Fiddler Magazine (Fall 2005)
Stavely, Zaidee Don Pedro Dimas: Rescuing Purépecha Music and Dance in Michoacán Fiddler Magazine (Spring 2005)

Dimas, Pedro
Dimas, Pedro
Dimas, Pedro
Dimas, Pedro
Dimas, Pedro
Dimas, Pedro
Dimas, Pedro
Dimas, Pedro
Dimas, Pedro
Dimas, Pedro
Mexican people of Purépecha descent
21st-century violinists
21st-century male musicians